Kotchevnik tapinus is a moth in the family Cossidae. It is found in Central Asia, where it has been recorded from Tajikistan, Turkmenistan, Iran, Afghanistan and Pakistan.

References

Natural History Museum Lepidoptera generic names catalog

Cossinae